Karl-August Frants (also Karl-August Randsalu; 20 February 1895 Laanemetsa Parish (now Valga Parish), Kreis Werro – 17 August 1942 Sverdlovsk Oblast) was an Estonian politician. He was a member of the V Riigikogu.

References

1895 births
1942 deaths
People from Valga Parish
People from Kreis Werro
Farmers' Assemblies politicians
Members of the Riigikogu, 1932–1934
Estonian people executed by the Soviet Union